Take the Money and Run is a 1969 American mockumentary comedy film directed by Woody Allen. Allen co-wrote the screenplay with Mickey Rose and stars alongside Janet Margolin. The film chronicles the life of Virgil Starkwell, an inept bank robber.

Filmed in San Francisco and San Quentin State Prison, Take the Money and Run received Golden Laurel nominations for Male Comedy Performance (Woody Allen) and Male New Face (Woody Allen), and a Writers Guild of America Award nomination for Best Comedy Written Directly for the Screen (Woody Allen, Mickey Rose).

Plot
Virgil Starkwell's (Woody Allen) story is told in documentary style, using fake stock footage and 'interviews' with people who knew him.  He begins a life of crime at a young age. As a child, Virgil is a frequent target of bullies, who take his glasses and stamp on them on the floor.  As an adult, Virgil is clumsy and socially awkward, and both police and judges discipline him by stamping on Virgil's glasses.

Virgil falls in love with a young lady, Louise (Janet Margolin), a laundry worker. They marry and later have a baby.

Virgil attempts to rob a bank, but is arrested when he is embroiled in an argument about the handwriting on a demand note he hands to a cashier.  He is sent to prison, but attempts an escape using a bar of soap carved to resemble a gun.  Unfortunately for him, it is raining outside and his gun dissolves. He does escape, but by accident.  Joining a mass breakout plan, Virgil is the only inmate not warned that the scheme had been called off.

Outside but unemployed, Virgil finds no way to support himself and his family.  Eventually, he is rearrested and sent to a chain gang, where he is undernourished (the single meal of the day is a bowl of steam) and brutally tortured (consigned to a steam box with an insurance salesman).

Virgil again escapes but is eventually captured when attempting to rob a former friend who reveals he is now a cop. He is sentenced to 800 years, but remains optimistic knowing that "with good behavior, I can get that cut in half". In the last scene, he is shown carving a bar of soap and asking the interviewer if it is raining outside.

Cast

Production
This was the second film directed by Woody Allen, and the first with original footage (after What's Up, Tiger Lily?, which consisted of visuals taken from a Japanese James Bond knockoff). He had originally wanted Jerry Lewis to direct, but when that did not work out, Allen decided to direct it himself. Allen's decision to become his own director was partially spurred on by the chaotic and uncontrolled filming of Casino Royale (1967), in which he had appeared two years previously. This film marked the first time Allen would perform the triple duties of writing, directing, and acting in a film. The manic, almost slapstick style is similar to that of Allen's next several films, including Bananas (1971) and Sleeper (1973).

Allen discussed the concept of filming a documentary in an interview with Richard Schickel:

The film was shot on location in San Francisco, including one scene set in Ernie's restaurant, whose striking red interior was immortalized in Alfred Hitchcock's Vertigo (1958). Other scenes were filmed at San Quentin State Prison, where 100 prisoners were paid a small fee to work on the film. The regular cast and crew were stamped each day with a special ink that glowed under ultra-violet light so the guards could tell who was allowed to leave the prison grounds at the end of the day. (One of the actors in the San Quentin scenes was Micil Murphy, who knew the prison well: he had served five and a half years there, for armed robbery, before being paroled in 1966.)

Allen initially filmed a downbeat ending in which he was shot to death, courtesy of special effects from A.D. Flowers. Reputedly the lighter ending is due to the influence of Allen's editor, Ralph Rosenblum, in his first collaboration with Allen.

Reception

Box office
The film opened on August 18, 1969 at the 68th St. Playhouse in New York City and grossed a house record $33,478 in its first week and even more in its second week with $35,999.

By 1973, the film had earned rentals of $2,590,000 in the United States and Canada and $450,000 in other countries. After all costs were deducted, it reported a loss of $610,000.

Critical response
The film received mostly positive reviews. Vincent Canby of The New York Times described it as "a movie that is, in effect, a feature-length, two-reel comedy—something very special and eccentric and funny", even though toward the end "a certain monotony sets in" with Allen's comedy rhythm. In his later review of Annie Hall, Canby revised his opinion of Take the Money and Run, stating "Annie Hall is not terribly far removed from Take the Money and Run, his first work as a triple-threat man, which is not to put down the new movie but to upgrade the earlier one".

Roger Ebert of the Chicago Sun-Times found the film to have many funny moments, but "in the last analysis it isn't a very funny movie", with the fault lying with its visual humor and editing. In October 2013, the film was voted by the Guardian readers as the sixth best film directed by Allen.

On the review aggregator web site Rotten Tomatoes, the film holds a 91% positive rating with an average rating of 6.9/10, based on 23 reviews.

Awards and honors
 Golden Laurel Nomination for Male Comedy Performance (Woody Allen)
 Golden Laurel Nomination for Male New Face (Woody Allen)
 Writers Guild of America Award Nomination for Best Comedy Written Directly for the Screen (Woody Allen, Mickey Rose).

The film is recognized by American Film Institute in these lists:
 2000: AFI's 100 Years...100 Laughs – #66
 2005: AFI's 100 Years...100 Movie Quotes:
 Bank Teller #1: "Does this look like "gub" or "gun"?"
 Bank Teller #2: "Gun. See? But what's "abt" mean?"
 Virgil Starkwell: "It's "act". A-C-T. Act natural. Please put fifty thousand dollars into this bag and act natural."
 Bank Teller #1: "Oh, I see. This is a holdup?"
 – Nominated

Home media
Take the Money and Run was released to DVD by MGM Home Video on July 6, 2004 as a Region 1 fullscreen DVD. Kino Video released the film on Blu-ray in October 2017, although the only bonus features are trailers for other films.

See also
 List of American films of 1969

References

External links

 
 
 
 
 

1960s crime comedy films
1969 films
American crime comedy films
American heist films
American independent films
American prison comedy films
Films scored by Marvin Hamlisch
Films about bank robbery
Films directed by Woody Allen
Films produced by Charles H. Joffe
Films set in San Quentin State Prison
Films shot in San Francisco
Films shot in San Quentin, California
American mockumentary films
Films with screenplays by Woody Allen
ABC Motion Pictures films
Films set in San Francisco
Cinerama Releasing Corporation films
1969 comedy films
1960s English-language films
1960s American films